Miss America 1958, the 31st Miss America pageant, was held at the Boardwalk Hall in Atlantic City, New Jersey on September 7, 1957 on CBS.

The winner, Marilyn Van Derbur, who was a Phi Beta Kappa scholar at the University of Colorado, performed a medley of the songs "Tenderly" and "Tea for Two" on the organ during the talent competition. She later revealed it was the only thing she knew how to play.

Results

Awards

Preliminary awards

Other awards

Contestants

External links
 Miss America official website

1958
1957 in the United States
1958 beauty pageants
1957 in New Jersey
September 1957 events in the United States
Events in Atlantic City, New Jersey